Touker Suleyman (born Türker Süleyman; 4 August 1953) is a British-Turkish Cypriot fashion retail entrepreneur, investor, and reality television personality. In 2001, his company Low Profile Group purchased UK shirt maker Hawes & Curtis, and in 2002 he purchased UK fashion label Ghost. Since then, he has invested in a number of start-up companies including Bikesoup and Huxley & Cox. Since 2015 he has been a dragon on Dragon's Den.

In 2015, The Sunday Times listed Suleyman as 637th in its Rich List, estimating his fortune to be in excess of £200 million.

Early life 
Suleyman was born in Famagusta on 4 August 1953, into a Turkish Cypriot family. In 1958, he moved to England with his family and settled in Bermondsey, South London. He arrived not speaking English and attended Peckham Manor secondary school. At age 10, he suffered a serious hand infection that resulted in him missing a year of school and at risk of an amputation of his left hand. Suleyman helped out working at his family's restaurant in Camberwell. He credits his father for being his inspiration to start his own business.

Career 
After leaving school, Suleyman joined a chartered accountancy firm in Southampton Row, London, heeding to his father's wishes that he enter a secure profession. He worked as an articled clerk earning £5.50 a week. Speaking of his experience there he states "I did the accounts for small clients like dentists and doctors, other accountants and small businesses. In a way it was educational, but quite boring. I saw that there were three ways to make money. You were either a pop star, in the fashion business, or in property."

While doing an audit for a clothing company, Suleyman took home some crimplene garments for his grandmother who later told him that her friends wanted the same. He purchased more which she then sold on his behalf for about a year. He describes this incident as his introduction to the fashion business. Suleyman went in to a partnership with the manufacturer operating out of a factory in East London before going on to form Kingsland Models which supplied clothing to the likes of C&A, Dorothy Perkins and Top Shop.

In the early 1980s, after being advised by a stockbroker, Suleyman took a 29.9% stake in clothing business Mellins. He was later persuaded by Laing & Cruickshank that Mellins should buy a stake in retailer Bamber Stores "because it offered synergy—we make it and we sell it." After Suleyman asked accountants Coopers & Lybrand to do a review, they discovered that the business had falsified their records and was £20–26 million in deficits. A board meeting was held the following Monday where Suleyman resigned, the company's shares were suspended, and receivers Cork Gully were called in. The collapse of Bamber Stores now forced Suleyman to find a way to raise money or see Mellins collapse too but he was unable to find investors. Suleyman was now stuck with debt and sold his house to repay money he owed to the bank.

Low Profile Group 

In 1984, Suleyman acquired a small cash-and-carry business which subsequently became Low Profile Group, a clothing manufacturer supplying UK retail stores including Marks & Spencer. The company’s factories are based in Turkey, Bulgaria, and Georgia.

Hawes & Curtis 

In 2001, Low Profile Group acquired Hawes & Curtis for £1. The company was £500,000 in debt and was about to go into administration. Turnover at Hawes & Curtis rose from £600,000 in 2001 to £30m in 2014, whilst Suleyman retained the Chairmanship of Hawes & Curtis.

As of 2014, Hawes & Curtis operates from 30 branches in the UK and one in Cologne, Germany. In 2013, UAE investment group Korath Holding signed a $5m deal to open 26 Hawes & Curtis stores across the Gulf over a period of five years.

Ghost 

In 2008, Suleyman purchased UK fashion label Ghost after its owner, KCAJ, an Icelandic investment fund, cut investment following the collapse of the Icelandic banking market. The acquisition safeguarded 142 jobs across the company. In 2009 the label announced its first collaboration with design duo Modernist.

Other investments 

Alongside Ghost, Touker Suleyman has invested in Tru-Tension, an innovative motorcycle and cycling brand; Docks Rio, a casual boat shoe brand; Intelligent Futures, an online advertising start-up; Personify XP, an AI personalisation start-up; Huxley & Cox, a manufacturer of luxury handbags; and Bikesoup, an online marketplace for bicycles in which he invested £100,000 for an undisclosed stake.

Dragons' Den

In 2015, Suleyman was chosen to join the investors' panel on the thirteenth series of BBC television programme Dragons' Den, alongside Nick Jenkins and Sarah Willingham. Suleyman is the only dragon out of the three to have remained on the show since.

Personal life 
Suleyman lives in London and has two daughters.

References

External links
 

1953 births
Living people
English people of Turkish Cypriot descent
Turkish Cypriot emigrants to the United Kingdom
People from Famagusta
Businesspeople from London
People from Peckham
English businesspeople in fashion
English television personalities